Lecithocera petalana is a moth in the family Lecithoceridae. It was described by Chun-Sheng Wu and You-Qiao Liu in 1993. It is found in Sichuan, China.

The wingspan is about 19 mm. The species resembles Lecithocera eumenopis, but the ground colour of the forewings is lighter.

References

Moths described in 1993
petalana
Moths of Asia